Memorial Day is a 1983 American made-for-television war drama film directed by Joseph Sargent and starring Mike Farrell, Robert Walden, Danny Glover and Shelley Fabares. It originally premiered November 27, 1983 on CBS.

Plot
Mike Farrell stars as an attorney who finds himself at the center of a surprise reunion with the veterans of his platoon from the Vietnam War, including Robert Walden and Edward Herrmann. The reunion stirs up painful memories and disturbing secrets for all involved.

Cast
 Mike Farrell as Matt Walker
 Robert Walden as Gibbs
 Danny Glover as Willie Monroe
 Edward Herrmann as Ned Larwin
 Bonnie Bedelia as Cass
 Bert Remsen as Clay Gibbs
 Alan Oppenheimer as Stallings
 Charles Cyphers as Jack Ruskin 
 Shelley Fabares as Ellie Walker
 Keith Michell as Marsh
 Jonathan Goldsmith as Banks
 Kaleena Kiff as Kara
 Tom Rosqui as Barney French
 Michael Talbott as Watney
 Robert Broyles as Preacher

References

External links
 

1983 television films
1983 films
1980s war drama films
American war drama films
Vietnam War films
CBS network films
Films directed by Joseph Sargent
Films scored by Billy Goldenberg
American drama television films
1980s English-language films
1980s American films